Lak Dasht may refer to:
 Lak Dasht, Juybar
 Lak Dasht, Sari